Mary Cannon is an Irish psychiatrist and research scientist. She has received the Royal Academy of Medicine in Ireland's "Doctors Award" for psychiatry, and is among the most highly cited scientists in the world. She is best known for her study of the risk factors for mental illness in young people.

Education 
As an undergraduate, Cannon studied medicine at University College Dublin and trained as a psychiatrist with Eadbhard O'Callaghan at the St John of God Hospital in Dublin. She then won an "advanced training fellowship" from the Wellcome Trust to study with Robin Murray at the Institute of Psychiatry in London.

Cannon cites her mother, a schoolteacher and principal, as a possible influence: "“My mother could predict which kids would have difficulties and which ones would do well,” recalls Cannon. “I always found it interesting that the seeds are sown so early.”"

Career 
Cannon is an associate professor of psychiatry at the Royal College of Surgeons in Ireland, as well as a consulting psychiatrist at Beaumont Hospital, Dublin.

Cannon researches risk factors for psychosis and other mental illnesses in young people. She and her research group have made important discoveries about the correlations of traumatic events in early childhood, including prenatal infection and childhood bullying, to psychiatric disorders such as schizophrenia in adults. Cannon also studies the mental health of Irish youth. Her group's discovery that more than one-fifth of Irish 11- to 13-year-olds have experienced "auditory hallucinations" (hearing voices) attracted significant media attention. She has expressed the desire that her findings will lessen the stigma around auditory hallucinations, and will help to "remove the boundary" between youth and adult psychiatric services and research.

Recognition 
In 2014, Cannon was the only woman among eleven Irish researchers named to the Thomson Reuters "World's Most Influential Scientific Minds" report. This report honours the 3,000 most highly cited scientists in the world.

Cannon has also won the Royal Academy of Medicine in Ireland's "Doctor Award" in Psychiatry, and the UK Health Research Board's "Clinician Scientist Award" fellowship. In 2022 she was elected a member of the Royal Irish Academy.

Selected publications

References 

Living people
Alumni of University College Dublin
Irish psychiatrists
Irish women scientists
Irish women medical doctors
Irish women psychiatrists
Members of the Royal Irish Academy
Royal College of Surgeons in Ireland
Year of birth missing (living people)